Gastropachinae is a subfamily of the moth family Lasiocampidae. It was first described by Berthold Neumoegen and Harrison Gray Dyar Jr. 1894.

This subfamily is distinguished form other Lasiocampidae by the adapted trait of an expanded humeral cell, and the presence of humeral veins.

Genera
Gastropacha Ochsenheimer, 1816
Heteropacha Harvey, 1874
Odonestis Germar, 1812
Pernattia Fletcher, 1982
Phyllodesma Hübner, [1820]

References

Lasiocampidae